Māris Gulbis (born October 4, 1985) is a Latvian professional basketball player who currently plays for the VEF Rīga.
He is 2.00 m (6 ft 6.75 in) and can play small forward and power forward positions.

References

1985 births
Living people
Basketball players from Riga
BC Šiauliai players
BK Barons players
BK Valmiera players
BK VEF Rīga players
BK Ventspils players
Latvian men's basketball players
Power forwards (basketball)